Fucose is a hexose deoxy sugar with the chemical formula C6H12O5.  It is found on N-linked glycans on the mammalian, insect and plant cell surface. Fucose is the fundamental sub-unit of the seaweed polysaccharide fucoidan. The α(1→3) linked core of fucose is a suspected carbohydrate antigen for IgE-mediated allergy.

Two structural features distinguish fucose from other six-carbon sugars present in mammals: the lack of a hydroxyl group on the carbon at the 6-position (C-6) (thereby making it a deoxy sugar) and the L-configuration. It is equivalent to 6-deoxy--galactose.

In the fucose-containing glycan structures, fucosylated glycans, fucose can exist as a terminal modification or serve as an attachment point for adding other sugars.
In human N-linked glycans, fucose is most commonly linked α-1,6 to the reducing terminal β-N-acetylglucosamine. However, fucose at the non-reducing termini linked α-1,2 to galactose forms the H antigen, the substructure of the A and B blood group antigens.

Fucose is released from fucose-containing polymers by an enzyme called α-fucosidase found in lysosomes.

-Fucose has several potential applications in cosmetics, pharmaceuticals, and dietary supplements

Fucosylation of antibodies has been established to reduce binding to the Fc receptor of Natural Killer cells and thereby reduce antigen-dependent cellular cytotoxicity. Therefore, afucosylated monoclonal antibodies have been designed to recruit the immune system to cancers cells have been manufactured in cell lines deficient in the enzyme for core fucosylation (FUT8), thereby enhancing the in vivo cell killing.

See also 
 Digitalose, the methyl ether of D-fucose
 Fucitol
 Verotoxin-producing Escherichia coli

References

Aldohexoses
Deoxy sugars